CASL may refer to:

 Committee of American Steamship Lines
 Canadian Association for School Libraries
 Canada's Anti-Spam Legislation
 Capital Area Soccer League
 Center for Advanced Study of Language
 Club Atletico San Lorenzo
 Commercial Aircraft Sales and Leasing
 Common Algebraic Specification Language
 Compact Application Solution Language
 China Aircraft Services Limited
 Complex and Adaptive Systems Laboratory
 Consortium for the Advanced Simulation of Light Water Reactors